Sphenomorphus muelleri  is a species of skink found in Indonesia.

References

muelleri
Reptiles described in 1837
Taxa named by George Albert Boulenger
Skinks of New Guinea